Lanfranc I of Bergamo (–950/954) was a northern Italian nobleman. He was a member of the dynasty known to historians as the Giselbertiners (or Giselbertini).

Life
Lanfranc was the son of Giselbert I of Bergamo and Rotruda of Pavia.

Lanfranc is first documented as a royal vassal (vassus regis) in 935. By 945 he was entitled count (probably of Bergamo) in a diploma issued by Hugh of Italy. Later that year Lanfranc became count palatine of Bergamo through the intervention of Berengar II of Italy.

He died sometime between 950 and 954.

Marriage and children
With his wife, whose name is not known, Lanfranc I had several children, including:
Giselbert II of Bergamo
 Franca

Notes

References
F. Menant, ‘Les Giselbertins, comtes du comté de Bergame et comtes palatins,’ in Formazione e strutture dei ceti dominanti nel medioevo (1988), pp. 115–186.
J. Jarnut, Bergamo 568-1098. Verfassungs-, Sozial- und Wirtschaftsgeschichte einer lombardischen Stadt im Mittelalter (Wiesbaden, 1977). 
E. Hlawitschka, Franken, Alemannen, Bayern und Burgunder in Oberitalien, 774-962: Zum Verständnis der fränkischen Königsherrschaft in Italien (Freiburg im Breisgau, 1960), accessible online at:  Genealogie Mittelalter

People from Bergamo
10th-century Italian nobility
Year of birth uncertain